Al-Nās or Mankind is the 114th and last chapter (sūrah) of the Qur'an. It is a short six-verse invocation.
۝ Say, "I seek refuge in the Lord of mankind,
۝ The Sovereign of mankind.
۝ The God of mankind,
۝ From the evil of the retreating whisperer –
۝ Who whispers [evil] into the breasts of mankind –
۝ From among the jinn and mankind."

The chapter takes its name from the word "men", "people" or "mankind" (al-nās), which recurs throughout the chapter. This and the preceding chapter, Al-Falaq ("Daybreak"), are known as "the Refuges" (Al-Mu'awwidhatayn): dealing with roughly the same theme, they form a natural pair.

Regarding the timing and contextual background of the believed revelation (asbāb al-nuzūl), it is an earlier "Meccan surah", which indicates a revelation in Mecca rather than Medina. Early Muslims were persecuted in Mecca where Muhammed was not a leader, and not persecuted in Medina, where he was a protected leader.

There is a Sunnah tradition of reading this chapter for the sick or before sleeping.

Text and meaning

Text and transliteration
Hafs from Aasim ibn Abi al-Najud

1 

2 

3 

4 

5 

6 

Warsh from Nafi‘ al-Madani

1 

2 

3 

4 

5 

6

Meanings

Say: "I seek refuge with (Allah) the Lord of mankind,

"The King of mankind,

"The Ilah (God) of mankind,

"From the evil of the whisperer (devil who whispers evil in the hearts of men) who withdraws (from his whispering in one's heart after one remembers Allah),

"Who whispers in the breasts of mankind,

"Of jinns and men."

Say, "I seek refuge in the Lord of mankind,

The Sovereign of mankind,

The God of mankind,

From the evil of the retreating whisperer –

Who whispers [evil] into the breasts of mankind –

From among the jinn and mankind."

{{right|Translation:Saheeh International, 1997}}

Say: I seek refuge with the Lord and Cherisher of Mankind,

The King (or Ruler) of Mankind,

The god (or judge) of Mankind,-

From the mischief of the Whisperer (of Evil), who withdraws (after his whisper),-

(The same) who whispers into the hearts of Mankind,-

Among Jinns and among men.

Say: I seek refuge in the Lord of mankind,

The King of mankind,

The god of mankind,

From the evil of the sneaking whisperer,

Who whispereth in the hearts of mankind,

Of the jinn and of mankind.

Impacts of the sūrah on a Muslim's life
According to 14th century exegesis of  Ibn Kathir (tafsir), it has been reported from Abu Sa'id that: Prophet Muhammad used to seek protection from the evil eyes of the jinn and mankind. But when the Muawwidhatayn were revealed, he used them (for protection) and abandoned all else besides them. Al-Tirmidhi, An-Nisai and ibn Majah recorded this.

Relations to other chapters
Being the last chapter of the Quran, it is a kind of final response to the invocation that the reader of the Quran is implored to make to God in Quran 1 (Al-Fatihah). The response is that even though God has provided detailed guidance, the seeker of guidance must also pray to God that he remains free from the 'whisper' (waswāsa) of the Satan.

Relation to topics discussed in previous chapter
The root problem is mentioned in Quran 113 (al-falaq) but more specific information is mentioned in this chapter as to the problem of the shaytan himself who puts waswāsa (whisperings) into the hearts of the people.

In Quran 113 (Q:113), God protects from the outward harms of evils, whereas in Quran 114 (Q:114) God protects from evils which affect inside; i.e. whisperings which can weaken belief, introduce doubts, or entice mankind towards evil.

In Q:113, there were evils which are harmful to mankind, but outside of people's control. The one committing those evils (i.e. magic, envy etc.) would be sinful.

In Q:114, there are evils which are whispered to people. If people act upon these whisperings, which call towards evil actions, people will be the ones who are sinful. Therefore, this is more of a desperate situation for people's beliefs, thus this is the greater danger for mankind.

Q:114 has more emphasis on seeking protection with God, in comparison to the previous chapter which had more emphasis on seeking protection against evil, so there is a reciprocity between these two chapters; al-Falaq mentions Lord once, and many evils, whereas al-Nas mentions one Evil (waswāsa/whisperings from shaytan), and mentions God many times.

Hadith

Hadith mentioning the benefits of the Surah
Quran 113 & Quran 114 are together called Al-Mu'awwidhatayn. 
Authentic or "Sahi" means the information is very reliable. 
Argumentative means there is a difference of opinion about these Hadith. Some believe they are correct. Others believe they are from weak sources. 
Unauthentic or weak or fabricated means the Hadith are not from trustworthy sources (but there can still be similar stories from a trustworthy source). 
Uncategorized is the Hadith which the editors have not yet decided are authentic or weak.

In Popular Culture
In Videogames
A 2021 psychological horror game called "iBLiS" (developed by FND Games) has included the last verse of the chapter being recited at the end of the game's intro.
The intro begins with an introduction to a real life Turkish urban legend about a late bride from Yakapinar Village in Ankara, who apparently had died in a car accident, causing her spirit to later haunt at the player along the gameplay. The intro ends with the final verse of the chapter being recited, foreshadowing the bride's possible connection with a jinn'' at some point before her death.

See also
 Al-Fatihah
 Al-Baqara 255
 Al-Falaq
 Al-Ikhlas
 Dua

Notes and references

External links

Quran 114  Clear Quran translation
Surah An Nas Download PDF

 Surah Nas Recitation Mp3 By Abdul Rahman Al Sudais

Nas